Ammi: Letter to a Democratic Mother is a debut novel by Indian Director and script writer Saeed Akhtar Mirza. It takes the form of a letter written by Mirza to his late mother.

External links 
 
 Saeed Akthar Mirza's novel launched
 Deccan Herald - Writing with integrity
 Print Article - Saeed Mirza writes book on parents
 The larger picture
 For you, 'Ammi'

2008 Indian novels
Epistolary novels
2008 debut novels

Ammi is a novel wrote upon a left perspective about Gujarat Riot's
Immediately after Gujarat Riot's Saeed Akhtar Mirza had a revisit India which taught him about writing a letter to his late mom about his worries of nation, democracy, and existence.